The Sanskrit word bhava (भव) means being, worldly existence, becoming, birth, be, production, origin, but also habitual or emotional tendencies.

In Buddhism, bhava is the tenth of the twelve links of Pratītyasamutpāda. It is the link between the defilements, and repeated birth, that is, reincarnation. In Thai Buddhism, bhava is also interpreted as habitual or emotional tendencies which leads to the arising of the sense of self, as a mental phenomenon.

In Buddhism 

In Buddhism, bhava (not bhāva, condition, nature) means being, worldly existence, becoming, birth, be, production, origin experience, in the sense of rebirths and redeaths, because a being is so conditioned and propelled by the karmic accumulations; but also habitual or emotional tendencies.

The term bhāva (भाव) is rooted in the term bhava (भव), and also has a double meaning, as emotion, sentiment, state of body or mind, disposition and character, and in some context also means becoming, being, existing, occurring, appearance while connoting the condition thereof.

Bhava is the tenth of the twelve links of pratītyasamutpāda (dependent origination), which describes samsara, the repeated cycle of our habitual responses to sensory impressions which leads to renewed jāti, birth. Birth is usually interpreted as rebirth in one of the realms of existence, namely heaven, demi-god, human, animal, hungry ghost or hell realms (bhavacakra) of Buddhist cosmology. In Thai Buddhism, bhava is also interpreted as the habitual or emotional tendencies which leads to the arising of the sense of self, as a mental phenomenon.

In the Jātakas, in which the Buddha didactically reminds various followers of experiences they shared with him in a past life, the hearers are said not to remember them due to bhava, i.e. to having been reborn.

In Hinduism

Bhava appears in the sense of becoming, being, existing, occurring, appearance in the Vedanga literature Srauta Sutras, the Upanishads such as the Shvetashvatara Upanishad, the Mahabharata and other ancient Hindu texts. When we are disrupted in any daily actitivies according to Sutra 1.2 of the Yoga Sutras of Patanjali: “Yoga Chitta Vritti Nirodha”. "Our highest duty Dharma is to ourselves to be in a balanced state of mind & to have faith". Our bhavas, our emotional frame or state of mind, if negativity becomes our frame which makes it difficult for us to perform our duties (dharmic, societal or other), during our daily activities it is correct to see to it that we are in a positive state, to start to balance our mind by making use of techniques of yoga such as; simple asanas, pranayamas, and yogic meditation. Sutra 2.6 of the Yoga Sutras of Patanjali: “Drk-Darsanasaktyoh-Ekatmata-Iva-Asmita”. "Egoism, the seer identifies with the instruments of power of seeing, with sight and mind, that [to the egoist] is seeing". There is either success because work was done in a manner with certainty to guarantee succeeding or it is learning there was no “failure.". This learning is Jana Bhava or knowledge, learning a different knowledge base of another people isn't a belonging of ours, only our learning truly is ours. Our learning isn't the same interpretation as another's learning, only minding our own learning can we feel sure that it belongs to us. My truth, their truth. Sutra 1.16 of the Yoga Sutras of Patanjali: “Tatparam Purusakhyateh Gunavaitrshnyam”. "Absolute knowledge of the soul of the universe (purusha) is obtained when the qualities of nature (Gunas) are understood and surpassed." We should learn to have a witness to every encounter or our moments like an “attitude.". This is having a little distance between events and ourselves, a little distance affords us surrendering to a higher reality, so that we are above our ego. We place our ego aside, reacting less and our thought is ahead of ego. Sutra 1.13 of the Yoga Sutras of Patanjali: “Tatra sthitau –yatnaḥ abhyāsaḥ”. "Abhyasa [or] practice is the effort to fix one's own self in a given attitude." When we practice and follow Dharma, Jana, and Vairagya then we have a self-reliance, positivity represented by confidence, will power and energy levels. "Practice makes a man perfect."

In Ramakrishna Mission 
According to Swami Shivananda, there are three kinds of bhava – sattvic, rajasic and tamasic. Which predominates in a person depends on their own nature, but sattvic bhava is Divine bhava or pure bhava (Suddha bhava). Swami Nikhilananda classifies bhava as follows:

śāntabhāva, the calm, peaceful, gentle or saintly attitude
dāsyabhāva, the attitude of devotion
sakhyabhāva, the attitude of a friend
vātsalyabhāva, the attitude of a mother towards her child
madhurabhāva (or kantabhava), the attitude of a woman in love
tanmayabhava, the attitude that the Lord is present everywhere

See also

Bhava samadhi
Rebirth (Buddhism)
Twelve Nidanas

References 

Twelve nidānas
Sanskrit words and phrases